Antonella Joannou (born 1 January 1967, Geneva) is a Swiss equestrian athlete. She competed at the 2018 FEI World Equestrian Games and at the 2017 FEI European Championships in Gothenburg. 

Antonella was selected as the first reserve rider for the 2021 Olympic Games in Tokyo by the Swiss Equestrian Federation.

References

1967 births
Living people
Swiss female equestrians
Swiss dressage riders
Sportspeople from Geneva